The 34th Massachusetts General Court, consisting of the Massachusetts Senate and the Massachusetts House of Representatives, met in 1813 and 1814 during the governorship of Caleb Strong. John Phillips served as president of the Senate and Timothy Bigelow served as speaker of the House.

Senators

Representatives

See also
 13th United States Congress
 List of Massachusetts General Courts

References

External links
 . (Includes data for state senate and house elections in 1813)
 
 
 
 

Political history of Massachusetts
Massachusetts legislative sessions
massachusetts
1814 in Massachusetts
massachusetts
1813 in Massachusetts